Piana Crixia is a comune (municipality) in the Province of Savona in the Italian region Liguria, located about  west of Genoa and about  northwest of Savona.

Piana Crixia borders the following municipalities: Castelletto Uzzone, Dego, Merana, Pezzolo Valle Uzzone, Serole, and Spigno Monferrato.

Demographic evolution

Twin towns — sister cities
Piana Crixia is twinned with:

  Saint-Jodard, France (2001)

References

Cities and towns in Liguria